San Mateo is a town in the eastern Venezuelan Anzoátegui State.  This town is the shire town of the Libertad Municipality and, according to the 2001 Venezuelan census, the municipality has a population of 12,905.

Demographics
The Libertad Municipality, according to the 2001 Venezuelan census, has a population of 12,905 (up from 12,617 in 1990).  This amounts to 1.1% of Anzoátegui's population.

Government
San Mateo is the shire town of the Libertad Municipality in Anzoátegui.  The mayor of the Libertad Municipality is Edgar Celestino Maestre M., elected in 2004 with 57% of the vote.  He replaced Juan Carlos Guillent shortly after the last municipal elections in October 2004.

References

External links
libertad-anzoategui.gob.ve 

Populated places in Anzoátegui